Willis is an unincorporated community in Marshall County, Oklahoma, United States. U.S. Route 377 passes near the community to the west.

History
The community of Willis, Oklahoma was settled in 1843 when James Hamilton Willis and his wife, Amanda, a Chickasaw family, emigrated to Indian Territory.  They built their house and a store east of what later became the site of Willis Bridge. The community that grew up around them became known as Willis. Their son, Raleigh "Brit" Willis, is credited with persuading the Federal Government to open a post office at Willis on March 15, 1856. According to the Marshall County Genealogical and Historical Society, the post office was established on March 15, 1866 and was discontinued on February 8, 1974. Willis became a successful farming community. The principal crops were:corn, cotton, sugar cane, peanuts and peas. Cattle, hogs, chickens and turkeys were also raised in the area. The community soon had a grist mill, a cotton gin and a blacksmith shop. A ferry was established to cross the Red River, enabling the people of the Willis area to trade in Denison and Sherman, Texas.

Houses and barns belonging to more than 40 families were moved or destroyed between 1941 and 1945. By 1945, only one store remained, which included the local post office.

References

Unincorporated communities in Marshall County, Oklahoma
Unincorporated communities in Oklahoma
Populated places established in 1843